Knife Skills is a 2017 American documentary film directed by Thomas Lennon. It was nominated for the Academy Award for Best Documentary Short Subject at the 90th Academy Awards. It received generally positive reviews from critics.

Summary
The film focuses on people's transition from prison life to the outside world through Edwins Leadership & Restaurant Institute in Cleveland, Ohio. The goal of the institute is to teach former prisoners life skills and to give them focus in order to reduce recidivism rates. The film follows the first class of students through their training and the opening of the restaurant by founder Brandon Chrostowski

References

External links
 Official site: Knife Skills
 Official Trailer KNIFE SKILLS 2017 from TFL Films LLC channel
 
 Watch Knife Skills at The New Yorker

2017 films
2017 short documentary films
American short documentary films
Documentary films about criminals
Documentary films about food and drink
2010s English-language films
2010s American films
Works originally published in The New Yorker